Alpha and Omega is Tonus Peregrinus's second album of unaccompanied choral works by Antony Pitts released on Hyperion Records.  The album contains the coda from the oratorio Jerusalem-Yerushalayim and the complete cycle of The I AM Sayings of Jesus.  Tracks from the album have been broadcast on BBC Radio 3 and Classic FM in the UK.

References

2008 classical albums
Tonus Peregrinus albums